Frisco is a small unincorporated community and census-designated place (CDP) on the barrier island of Hatteras Island, between the villages of Buxton and Hatteras. It is located in Dare County, North Carolina, United States, and was previously named "Trent", or "Trent Woods", but received a new name with the coming of the post office in 1898. Most of the land is taken by houses available for rental during the summer months, and as such the community's population varies seasonally. As of the 2010 census, the permanent population of the community was 200. North Carolina Highway 12 serves as the primary road in Frisco and connects the community to others on the island.

Billy Mitchell Airport is located in Frisco and was named after former Army General Billy Mitchell. Across the street from the small, local airfield is the Frisco Native American Museum.

The residents of Frisco are governed by the Dare County Board of Commissioners. Frisco is part of District 4, along with Avon, Buxton, Hatteras, Rodanthe, Waves and Salvo.

Demographics

2020 census

As of the 2020 United States census, there were 994 people, 76 households, and 28 families residing in the CDP.

Public services
Residents of Frisco are served by the Cape Hatteras Elementary and Secondary Schools located on NC 12 in Frisco.

Area attractions
Cape Hatteras National Seashore
Frisco Campground
Frisco Pier (Destroyed by Hurricane Earl, 2010)
Billy Mitchell Airport
Frisco Native American Museum
Frisco Mini-Golf and Go Karts
Red Drum Pottery Gallery and Theater

Climate

According to the Trewartha climate classification system, Frisco, North Carolina has a humid subtropical climate with hot and humid summers, cool winters and year-around precipitation (Cfak). Cfak climates are characterized by all months having an average mean temperature > 32.0 °F (> 0.0 °C), at least eight months with an average mean temperature ≥ 50.0 °F (≥ 10.0 °C), at least one month with an average mean temperature ≥ 71.6 °F (≥ 22.0 °C) and no significant precipitation difference between seasons. During the summer months in Frisco, a cooling afternoon sea breeze is present on most days, but episodes of extreme heat and humidity can occur with heat index values ≥ 100 °F (≥ 38 °C). Frisco is prone to hurricane strikes, particularly during the Atlantic hurricane season which extends from June 1 through November 30, sharply peaking from late August through September. During the winter months, episodes of cold and wind can occur with wind chill values < 15 °F (< -9 °C). The plant hardiness zone in Frisco is 8b with an average annual extreme minimum air temperature of 19.9 °F (-6.7 °C). The average seasonal (Dec-Mar) snowfall total is < 2 inches (< 5 cm), and the average annual peak in nor'easter activity is in February.

Ecology

According to the A. W. Kuchler U.S. potential natural vegetation types, Frisco, North Carolina would have a dominant vegetation type of Live oak/Sea Oats Uniola paniculata (90) with a dominant vegetation form of Coastal Prairie (20).

Education
Residents are zoned to Dare County Schools. Zoned schools are Cape Hatteras Elementary School and Cape Hatteras Secondary School.

References

External links
 Graveyard of the Atlantic Museum

Populated places established in 1898
Census-designated places in North Carolina
Census-designated places in Dare County, North Carolina
Hatteras Island
Beaches of North Carolina
1898 establishments in North Carolina
Beaches of Dare County, North Carolina
Populated coastal places in North Carolina